John Arthur Curzon Thornton (24 February 1902 – November 1993) was an English cricketer. Thornton was a right-handed batsman who bowled right-arm fast-medium. He was born at Stoneygate, Leicestershire.

Educated at Uppingham School, Thornton made his first-class debut for Leicestershire against Kent in the 1921 County Championship. He made two further first-class appearances for the county in that season's County Championship, against Warwickshire and Derbyshire. He scored 53 runs in his three matches with a high score of 19 not out, while with the ball, he took a single wicket.

He died at Cambridge, Cambridgeshire in November 1993. His brother Frank also played first-class cricket.

References

External links
John Thornton at ESPNcricinfo
John Thornton at CricketArchive

1902 births
1993 deaths
Cricketers from Leicester
People educated at Uppingham School
English cricketers
Leicestershire cricketers
People from Stoneygate